"The Medicine Song" is a 1984 single by Stephanie Mills. It gave Mills her first number one Dance chart hit; her previous entry on the chart had been "Pilot Error", which had made it to number three.

"The Medicine Song" stayed at the top spot on the dance chart for one week. The single was her fourth entry to make the top 10 on the Soul singles chart, peaking at number eight. It also charted on the Billboard Hot 100, and was a top 30 hit in the UK.

Charts

Weekly charts

Year-end charts

References

1984 singles
Stephanie Mills songs
1984 songs
Casablanca Records singles
Songs written by Hawk Wolinski